Arbor Low is a well-preserved Neolithic henge in the Derbyshire Peak District, England. It lies on a Carboniferous Limestone plateau known as the White Peak area. The monument consists of a stone circle surrounded by earthworks and a ditch.

Description 
The monument includes about 50 large limestone blocks, quarried from a local site, which form an egg-shaped circle. There were probably 41-43 stones originally, but some are now in fragments. One stone is partially upright; the rest are lying flat. Although it is often stated that the stones have never stood upright, it is possible that they had originally been set upright in shallow stone holes.

In the centre of the circle lie at least six smaller blocks known as the cove, originally believed to have been set in a rectangle.

Few henge monuments in the British Isles are as well preserved.

Finds 
Human skeletal remains were discovered close to the cove during excavations between 1901 and 1902. Other finds have included flint scrapers, arrowheads, and bone and antler tools.

Surrounding landscape 
A large Bronze Age round cairn or barrow was built later, to the east of the henge, using material taken from the earth bank. It was excavated in 1845 and found to contain a cremation burial, flint and bone artefacts, and two pots similar to Late Neolithic Peterborough ware now in the care of Weston Park Museum.

Arbor Low is part of a larger complex, and is linked by an earth ridge to the earlier Neolithic oval barrow of Gib Hill 320m away.

Construction and usage 
The bank and ditch of the henge, as well as its two entrances, were probably established in the Late Neolithic period, with the stones added later, sometime before 2000 BCE. The site seems to have been in use until the Bronze Age, when the outer bank was reconstructed so that the round barrow could be erected. Both the earthworks and the stoneworks are probably later than the nearby Gib Hill.

Statutory protection 

Arbor Low was one of the first ancient monuments to be given statutory protection, on 18 August 1882.  Small stone markers engraved VR and GR (for Victoria Regina and Georgius Rex) still stand around the henge, demarcating the protected area.

Access 
The henge stands on private farmland but is accessible to the public. As of September 2020, an entrance fee of £1 per adult is requested. Children can enter free of charge.

See also 
 The Bull Ring

References

Further reading 
 
Addy, S.O. (1911). The ‘Harbour’ and Barrows at Arbour-Lows. Journal of the Derbyshire Archaeological and Natural History Society, 33, 39–58.
Arnold-Bemrose, H.H. (1904). Geological notes on Arbor Low. Journal of the Derbyshire Archaeological and Natural History Society, 26, 78–79.
Barnatt, J (1990). The henges, stone circles and ringcairns of the Peak District. Sheffield Archaeological Monographs, Department of Archaeology and Prehistory, University of Sheffield. - 
Bateman, T. (1848). Vestiges of Antiquity. John Russell Smith, London.
Cox, Rev. J.C. (1884). Some notes on Arbor Low. Journal of the Derbyshire Archaeological and Natural History Society, 6, 97–107.
Gray, H. St George. (1903). On the excavation at Arbor Low 1901–2. Archaeologia, 38.
Heathcote, J.P. (1956). Arbor Low. Today, the Days of Old, and the Years of Ancient Times. 5th Ed. 
Matthews, T.A. (1907). Some notes on Arbor Low and other lows in the High Peak. Journal of the Derbyshire Archaeological and Natural History Society, 29, 103–112.
Matthews, T.A. (1911). Some further notes on the lows in the High Peak. Journal of the Derbyshire Archaeological and Natural History Society, 33, 87–94.
Pegge, S. (1793). A Disquisition on the Lows or Barrows in the Peak of Derbyshire. Archaeologia, VIII, 131–148.
Radley, J. (1968). The origin of Arbor Low henge monument. Derbyshire Archaeological Journal, 88, 100–103.

External links

 Visitor information (English Heritage)

Archaeological sites in Derbyshire
English Heritage sites in Derbyshire
History of Derbyshire
Peak District
Stone circles in Derbyshire
Tourist attractions in Derbyshire
Scheduled monuments in Derbyshire
Henges